XMK may refer to:
 The ISO-639-3.5 code for the Ancient Macedonian language
 The eXtreme Minimal Kernel, a real-time operating system